Emanuel Hernán Mammana (born 10 February 1996) is an Argentine footballer who plays as a centre-back for Argentine Primera División club River Plate.

Club career

River Plate
Mammana made his debut for River Plate on 3 December, in the 2014 Copa Sudamericana Final 1st leg. He scored his first senior goal on 14 March 2016, in a 4–1 loss to Colón.

Olympique Lyon
On 7 July 2016, he signed a five-year contract with French club Lyon. He scored his first goal for the club in a 1–1 draw with Bordeaux.

Zenit Saint Petersburg
On 31 July 2017, Mammana signed a five-year contract with the Russian club FC Zenit Saint Petersburg. On 11 March 2018 in a game against FC Rostov he suffered an anterior cruciate ligament injury which forced him to miss almost six months of games, that time period included the 2018 FIFA World Cup. Upon his recovery, he could not get back into the lineup in the 2018–19 season. On 6 October 2019, he suffered another ligament injury in a game against FC Ural Yekaterinburg and missed 9 more months of games, before returning in the last game of the 2019–20 season. In June 2021, after returning from Sochi loan, he was sent by Zenit to train with the second team, FC Zenit-2 Saint Petersburg. On 7 January 2022, his contract with Zenit was terminated by mutual consent.

Loan to Sochi
On 7 August 2020, he joined PFC Sochi on loan for the 2020–21 season. On 19 July 2021, Mammana returned to Sochi on loan for the 2021–22 season.

International career
Mammana played his first international game with the senior national team on 7 June 2014 in a 2–0 win against Slovenia coming on as a substitute for Javier Mascherano in the 77th minute.

Career statistics

Club

Honours
River Plate
Primera División: 2014 Final
Copa Sudamericana: 2014
Recopa Sudamericana: 2015
Copa Libertadores: 2015
Suruga Bank: 2015

Zenit Saint Petersburg
Russian Premier League: 2018–19, 2019–20
 Russian Cup: 2019–20

International
Argentina U20
South American Youth Football Championship: 2015

Argentina
Superclásico de las Américas: 2017

References

External links
 

1996 births
Living people
Argentine footballers
Argentina international footballers
2015 South American Youth Football Championship players
Argentina youth international footballers
Argentina under-20 international footballers
Argentine expatriate footballers
Argentine Primera División players
Ligue 1 players
Championnat National 2 players
Club Atlético River Plate footballers
Olympique Lyonnais players
Expatriate footballers in France
Argentine expatriate sportspeople in France
Association football defenders
Footballers from Buenos Aires
FC Zenit Saint Petersburg players
PFC Sochi players
Expatriate footballers in Russia
Argentine expatriate sportspeople in Russia
Russian Premier League players
Association football central defenders